Del Monroe (April 7, 1932June 5, 2009) was an American film, television and stage actor. He is best known for his role as Seaman Kowalski in the television series Voyage to the Bottom of the Sea, which was broadcast on ABC from September 14, 1964 to March 31, 1968.

Early life
Monroe was born in Santa Barbara, California. After a tour of duty in the United States Army he enrolled in the Pasadena Playhouse where he appeared in more than 30 plays.

Voyage to the Bottom of the Sea
In 1961, Monroe portrayed Seaman Kowaski in the film version of Voyage to the Bottom of the Sea. Monroe continued in this role in the television series based on the film, although in the series his characters name was changed to Kowalski. He is fondly remembered for this role.

Other roles
In 1967, Monroe appeared in the episode "The Kidnappers" in Irwin Allen's show, The Time Tunnel. Monroe also appeared in other television shows including Gunsmoke (3 episodes), The Silent Force, Emergency! (3 episodes), Adam-12, Mission: Impossible, Mannix  (2 episodes), The Amazing Spider-Man, Wonder Woman, The Dukes of Hazzard, Rockford Files (2 episodes), and The Incredible Hulk. His other film credits included Adam at 6 A.M. (1970), Walking Tall (1973), and as an old timer in Speedway Junky (1999). His final appearance was in an episode of Medium in 2005.

Filmography

References

External links

American male film actors
American male television actors
Male actors from Santa Barbara, California
1932 births
2009 deaths
20th-century American male actors